The Pfannenstock (2,573 m) is a mountain of the Schwyzer Alps, located east of Muotathal in the Swiss canton of Schwyz. It lies on the karstic range between the valleys of Muota and Linth, west of the border with the canton of Glarus.

References

External links
 Pfannenstock on Hikr

Mountains of Switzerland
Mountains of the Alps
Mountains of the canton of Schwyz